NumBuster! is a phone community that users can access via a mobile phone client and a Web application. Developed by NumBuster Ltd, it allows users to find contact details of any phone number, exchange information about numbers with other users and block calls and messages. The client is available for Android and Apple iOS.

History 

NumBuster! was developed by NumBuster Ltd, a privately held company founded by Evgeny Gnutikov, Ilya Osipov and some others. The project was launched on Android in May 2013 and as a Web site in February 2014. As of September 2014, it has more than 100 000 users in Russia and the CIS, where it was first launched. In July–August 2014, NumBuster! was accelerated in the biggest startup accelerator in France, NUMA Paris.

Features and functionality
The service is a global telephone directory that has social and call + SMS blocking functionality. It allows its users not only to find out the name of an unfamiliar caller or SMS sender, whether it's a person or a business, but also to rate and comment, thus adding more value to the service and helping other users in the community to get more information. Apart from that, users can block any phone number. Application is available on Android from May 2013 and on Apple iPhone from September 2014.

Languages and localization
NumBuster! is available in 12 languages: English, Russian, Turkish, Arabic, French, Chinese, Italian, Portuguese, Hindi, Spanish, Ukrainian and Korean.

Reception

Upon its release, NumBuster! gathered positive feedback from Russian bloggers and media, including a publication in a leading news web-site.

See also 

 List of most downloaded Android applications
 Truecaller
 Truth in Caller ID Act of 2009

References

External links 
 
NumBuster!  on Apple AppStore
 
 

Android (operating system) software
Cross-platform software
Communication software
2014 software
Mobile software
IOS software
Social networking services
Windows Phone software
Caller ID